The Padma Bhushan is the third-highest civilian award of the Republic of India. Instituted on 2January 1954, the award is given for "distinguished service of a high order", without distinction of race, occupation, position, or sex. The recipients receive a Sanad, a certificate signed by the President of India and a circular-shaped medallion with no monetary association. The recipients are announced every year on Republic Day (26January) and registered in The Gazette of Indiaa publication used for official government notices and released weekly by the Department of Publication, under the Ministry of Urban Development. The conferral of the award is not considered official without its publication in the Gazette. The name of recipient, whose award have been revoked or restored, both of which require the authority of the President, is archived and they are required to surrender their medal when their name is struck from the register; none of the conferments of Padma Bhushan during 1970–1979 have been revoked or restored. The recommendations are received from all the state and the union territory governments, as well as from Ministries of the Government of India, the Bharat Ratna and the Padma Vibhushan awardees, the Institutes of Excellence, the Ministers, the Chief Ministers and the Governors of State, and the Members of Parliament including private individuals.

When instituted in 1954, the Padma Bhushan was classified as "Dusra Varg" (Class II) under the three-tier Padma Vibhushan awards, which were preceded by the Bharat Ratna in hierarchy. On 15January 1955, the Padma Vibhushan was reclassified into three different awards as the Padma Vibhushan, the Padma Bhushan and the Padma Shri. The criteria included "distinguished service of a high order in any field including service rendered by Government servants", but excluded those working with the public sector undertakings with the exception of doctors and scientists. The 1954 statutes did not allow posthumous awards; this was subsequently modified in the January 1955 statute. The centrally placed pattern made of outer lines of a square of  side is embossed with a knob carved within each of the outer angles of the pattern. A raised circular space of diameter  is placed at the centre of the decoration. A centrally located lotus flower is embossed on the obverse side of the medal and the text "Padma" is placed above and the text "Bhushan" is placed below the lotus written in Devanagari script. The State Emblem of India is displayed in the centre of the reverse side, together with the national motto of India, "Satyameva Jayate" (Truth alone triumphs) in Devanagari script, which is inscribed on the lower edge. The rim, the edges and all embossing on either side is of standard gold with the text "Padma Bhushan" of gold gilt. The medal is suspended by a pink riband  in width with a broad white stripe in the middle. It is ranked fifth in the order of precedence of wearing of medals and decorations of the Indian civilian and military awards.

As the result of the 6th general election held in March 1977, Morarji Desai was sworn in as the Prime Minister of India on 24March 1977 replacing the Indira Gandhi led government of the Indian National Congress. On 31July, the newly formed government retracted all the civilian awards including the Padma Bhushan deeming them "worthless and politicized". After the 7th general election of 1980 Gandhi was again sworn in as the Prime Minister and all civilian awards were reinstated on 25January 1980. Consequently, this award was not presented in 1978 and 1979.

A total of 205 awards were presented in the 1970s twenty-eight in 1970, followed by forty-one in 1971, fifty in 1972, seventeen in 1973, twenty-one in 1974, fifteen in 1975, sixteen in 1976 and seventeen in 1977. The Padma Bhushan in the 1970s was also conferred upon eight foreign recipients four from the United States, two from Italy, and one each from Belgium and the United Kingdom. Individuals from nine different fields were awarded, which includes forty-eight from literature and education, forty-three from civil services, thirty-four artists, twenty-six from science and engineering, twenty-one from social work, seventeen from medicine, twelve from trade and industry, three from public affairs, and one sportsperson. Novelist Khushwant Singh, who accepted the award in 1974 in the field of literature and education, returned it in 1984 as a notion of protest against the Operation Blue Star.

Recipients

Explanatory notes 

Non-citizen recipients

Posthumous recipients

References

External links 
 
 

Lists of Indian award winners